USS General Grant was a steamship chartered from the U.S. War Department by the Union Navy during the American Civil War. She was used by the Navy as a gunboat in waterways of the Confederate South.

Constructed in Pennsylvania in 1863 
General Grant was built in 1863 at Monongahela, Pennsylvania; purchased by the War Department; chartered by the Navy and commissioned at Bridgeport, Alabama, 20 July 1864, Acting Master Joseph Watson in command.

Patrolling the Tennessee River 
General Grant constantly patrolled the upper Tennessee River from Bridgeport until close of the Civil War, fighting guerrillas and aiding the Union Army in clearing Confederate troops from the region.

River operations under fire 
In October 1864 she destroyed 22 small boats off Port Deposit and Crow Island. On 25 November she assisted in taking up pontoon bridges under guns of Confederate sharpshooters at Decatur, Alabama. She hurled 52 shells into that town 12 December 1864 and joined  15 January 1865 in the destructive bombardment of Guntersville, Alabama.

Post-war decommissioning, sale, and subsequent career 
She decommissioned and was returned to the War Department 2 June 1865. She was lost when stranded in ice 18 March 1866 at Plattsmouth, Nebraska.

References 

Ships of the Union Navy
Ships built in Monongahela, Pennsylvania
Steamships of the United States Navy
Gunboats of the United States Navy
American Civil War patrol vessels of the United States
1863 ships